Cheerleader Queens (aka I'm Lady) is a 2003 Thai film directed by Poj Arnon.

Plot 
Four kathoey—Mod, Som, Kam-pang and Wa-wa—move from a rural town to attend St. Mary's High School in Bangkok. Once there they try to join the school's cheerleading team, only to be rejected because of their sexuality. Instead they join the school's struggling rugby team, making friends with the other team members after they score a number of tries in an important game.

Toey, another kathoey from the boys hometown, comes to Bangkok with the idea of forming a new cheerleading team, which they name "The Queen". From the start the boys have to face a number of problems, but with the help of their friends on the rugby team they manage to get to the finals of the national cheerleading competition.

Reception 
Ronnie Scheib of Variety reviewed Cheerleader Queens at the 2004 New York Lesbian, Gay, Bisexual, & Transgender Film Festival. He described the film as, "A fun date flick for all persuasions, with sexual content limited to a few chaste kisses and endless eye-batting innuendo, kitschy curio should perform cheerily on the gay fest circuit."

References

External links 
 
 

2003 films
2003 LGBT-related films
Cheerleading films
Kathoey
Thai-language films
Thai LGBT-related films
Transgender-related films
Rugby union films
Films directed by Poj Arnon
LGBT-related sports comedy films